The 4th Lux Style Awards ceremony was held in Expo Center in Karachi, Pakistan. The show was hosted by Junaid Khan and Aamina Sheikh and from the members of Banana News Network. The show had the performances by Humayun Saeed, Zara Sheikh, Veena Malik, Ali Zafar, Meesha Shafi and Sadia Imam. Some of the film and music categories were removed from the award.

Films

Best Film
Salakhain

Television

Music

Special 
Chairperson's Lifetime Award   

Shamim Ara

References

Lux Style Awards
Lux Style Awards
Lux Style Awards
Lux Style Awards
Lux
Lux
Lux